Hina is a town, commune and political sub division in the Department of Mayo-Tsanaga in the Far North Region of Cameroon.

Climate
Hina has a tropical savanna climate (Aw) with little to no rain from October to April and moderate to heavy rainfall from May to September.

See also
Communes of Cameroon

References

 Site de la primature - Élections municipales 2002 
 Contrôle de gestion et performance des services publics communaux des villes camerounaises - Thèse de Donation Avele, Université Montesquieu Bordeaux IV 
 Charles Nanga, La réforme de l’administration territoriale au Cameroun à la lumière de la loi constitutionnelle n° 96/06 du 18 janvier 1996, Mémoire ENA. 

Communes of Far North Region (Cameroon)